Gephyromantis webbi, commonly known as Webb's Madagascar frog, is a species of frog in the family Mantellidae.  It is endemic to Madagascar.  Its natural habitats are subtropical or tropical moist lowland forests and rivers.  It is threatened by habitat loss.

Sources

webbi
Endemic fauna of Madagascar
Taxonomy articles created by Polbot
Amphibians described in 1953